Leenhardt is a French surname. Notable people with the surname include:
Étienne Leenhardt (1962—), journalist
 Maurice Leenhardt (1876—1954), anthropologist
 Max Leenhardt (1853—1941), painter
 Roger Leenhardt (1903—1985), filmmaker

French-language surnames